The 2021–22 Army Black Knights men's ice hockey season was the 119th season of play for the program, the 112th at the Division I level, and the 19th season in the Atlantic Hockey conference. The Black Knights represented the United States Military Academy and were coached by Brian Riley, in his 18th season.

Season
Army began the season with junior Justin Evenson as the team's starting goaltender. After two poor performance, however, Gavin Abric was given a turn in the net and the results improved. Despite in uptick in the goaltending, however, Army's offense suffered early in the year and the Black Knights went winless in their first six games. The team picked up their game in late October and managed to climb their way back to a .500 record by the winter break with senior All-American Colin Bilek leading the way.

An uptick in COVID-19 positives in January didn't affect Army too badly, however, it caused the cancellation of their annual meeting with the Royal Military College Paladins for the second straight season.

In the second half of the season, Army wasn't able to play very consistently and ended up losing slightly more than they won. Fortunately for the Black Knights, Atlantic Hockey was a sea of mediocrity that year and Army managed to finish third in the conference standings despite being just 1 game above .500.

Army played host to Air Force in the conference quarterfinals but the Black Knights' defense faltered. Army allowed their rival to fire 86 shots on goal in the two games and surrendered overtime goals in both.

Departures

Recruiting

Roster
As of August 23, 2021.

Standings

Schedule and results

|-
!colspan=12 style=";" | Regular Season

|-
!colspan=12 style=";" | 

|- align="center" bgcolor="#e0e0e0"
|colspan=12|Army Lost Series 0–2

Scoring statistics
{| class="wikitable sortable" width ="50%"
|- align="center"

|- align="center" bgcolor=""
|  || RW || 34 || 11 || 20 || 31 || 37
|- align="center" bgcolor="f0f0f0"
|  || D || 35 || 9 || 12 || 21 || 26
|- align="center" bgcolor=""
|  || F || 30 || 8 || 12 || 20 || 6
|- align="center" bgcolor="f0f0f0"
|  || D || 35 || 4 || 14 || 18 || 48
|- align="center" bgcolor=""
|  || F || 35 || 11 || 6 || 17 || 10
|- align="center" bgcolor="f0f0f0"
|  || F || 35 || 7 || 10 || 17 || 8
|- align="center" bgcolor=""
|  || LW || 35 || 8 || 8 || 16 || 16
|- align="center" bgcolor="f0f0f0"
|  || F || 35 || 7 || 8 || 15 || 24
|- align="center" bgcolor=""
|  || F || 34 || 6 || 9 || 15 || 21
|- align="center" bgcolor="f0f0f0"
|  || D || 33 || 2 || 13 || 15 || 6
|- align="center" bgcolor=""
|  || C || 26 || 3 || 9 || 12 || 4
|- align="center" bgcolor="f0f0f0"
|  || F || 35 || 2 || 7 || 9 || 2
|- align="center" bgcolor=""
|  || D || 23 || 1 || 8 || 9 || 10
|- align="center" bgcolor="f0f0f0"
|  || D || 31 || 0 || 7 || 7 || 14
|- align="center" bgcolor=""
|  || F || 23 || 3 || 3 || 6 || 8
|- align="center" bgcolor="f0f0f0"
|  || D || 25 || 2 || 4 || 6 || 23
|- align="center" bgcolor=""
|  || D || 30 || 1 || 5 || ''6 || 30
|- align="center" bgcolor="f0f0f0"
|  || F || 14 || 3 || 2 || 5 || 4
|- align="center" bgcolor=""
|  || LW || 21 || 3 || 2 || 5 || 8
|- align="center" bgcolor="f0f0f0"
|  || F || 19 || 2 || 3 || 5 || 6
|- align="center" bgcolor=""
|  || F || 25 || 1 || 4 || 5 || 6
|- align="center" bgcolor="f0f0f0"
|  || F || 18 || 2 || 1 || 3 || 4
|- align="center" bgcolor=""
|  || F || 16 || 2 || 0 || 2 || 2
|- align="center" bgcolor="f0f0f0"
|  || D || 9 || 0 || 1 || 1 || 0
|- align="center" bgcolor=""
|  || D || 1 || 0 || 0 || 0 || 0
|- align="center" bgcolor="f0f0f0"
|  || G || 3 || 0 || 0 || 0 || 0
|- align="center" bgcolor=""
|  || G || 10 || 0 || 0 || 0 || 0
|- align="center" bgcolor="f0f0f0"
|  || G || 31 || 0 || 0 || 0 || 0
|-
! Total !! !! !! 98 !! 167 !! 265 !! 323
|}Source:'''

Goaltending statistics

Rankings

Note: USCHO did not release a poll in week 24.

Awards and honors

References

Army Black Knights men's ice hockey seasons
Army Black Knights
Army Black Knights
Army Black Knights men's ice hockey
Army Black Knights men's ice hockey